Deshane Dalling (born 13 August 1998) is an English footballer who plays as a midfielder for Lewes.

Club career
On 23 May 2018, Dalling signed a contract with Queens Park Rangers. Dalling made his professional debut with Queens Park Rangers in a 5-1 FA Cup win over Swansea City on 5 January 2020.

On 13 February 2020, Dalling signed for League of Ireland Premier Division side Cork City on a loan deal until June. He made his debut at home to Shelbourne in a 0–1 defeat on the opening day of the 2020 season Dalling's second game for the club ended in disaster after he was sent off following a 45th minute straight red card for a two footed lunge on Joey O'Brien, as his side lost 6–0 to Shamrock Rovers at Tallaght Stadium.

On 30 January 2021, Dalling signed for Wealdstone on a one month loan deal. He made two appearances for the club before the end of his loan.

On 17 September 2021 - after a short spell at Hemel Hempstead Town - Dalling joined Dartford.

On 11 December 2021, Dalling joined Lewes. He joined Whitehawk on a month's loan on 30 September 2022.

Career statistics

References

External links

QPR Profile

1998 births
Living people
English footballers
Association football midfielders
Queens Park Rangers F.C. players
Black British sportspeople
Cork City F.C. players
Wealdstone F.C. players
Hemel Hempstead Town F.C. players
Dartford F.C. players
Lewes F.C. players
Whitehawk F.C. players
League of Ireland players
English Football League players
Expatriate association footballers in the Republic of Ireland